Cigánd is a district in north-eastern part of Borsod-Abaúj-Zemplén County. The district seat is in a town that is called Cigánd as well. The district is located in the Northern Hungary Statistical Region.

Geography 
Cigánd District borders with the Slovakian region of Košice to the north, Záhony District (Szabolcs-Szatmár-Bereg County) to the east, Kisvárda District and Ibrány District (Szabolcs-Szatmár-Bereg County) to the south, Sárospatak District and Sátoraljaújhely District to the west. The number of the inhabited places in Cigánd District is 15.

Municipalities 
The district has 1 town, 1 large village and 13 villages.
(ordered by population, as of 1 January 2012)

The bolded municipality is city, italics municipality is large village.

Demographics

In 2011, it had a population of 16,042 and the population density was 41/km².

Ethnicity
Besides the Hungarian majority, the main minority is the Roma (approx. 3,000).

Total population (2011 census): 16,042
Ethnic groups (2011 census): Identified themselves: 17,333 persons:
Hungarians: 14,606 (84.27%)
Gypsies: 2,646 (15.27%)
Others and indefinable: 81 (0.47%)
Approx. 1,500 persons in Cigánd District did declare more than one ethnic group at the 2011 census.

Religion
Religious adherence in the county according to 2011 census:

Reformed – 7,958;
Catholic – 3,770 (Roman Catholic – 2,510; Greek Catholic – 1,260); 
other religions – 438; 
Non-religious – 1,419; 
Atheism – 21;
Undeclared – 2,436.

Gallery

See also
List of cities and towns of Hungary

References

External links
 Postal codes of the Cigánd District

Districts in Borsod-Abaúj-Zemplén County